Jean M. Redmann (born June 9, 1955 in Mississippi, US), known professionally as J. M. Redmann and R. Jean Reid, is an American novelist best known for her Micky Knight mystery series, which has won the Lambda Literary Award for Lesbian Mystery three times and been a finalist four times.

Redmann's novels contain similar themes regarding "the protagonist's troubled childhood and how it affects her adult life, discrimination based on sexual orientation and alcoholism. Her novels follow the tradition of hardboiled fiction."

She "is a gay rights activist and works as the director of prevention at NO/AIDS Task Force."

Awards

Bibliography

Anthology contributions 

 The Milk of Human Kindness, edited by Lori L. Lake (2004)
 Women of Mystery: An Anthology, edited by Katherine V. Forrest (2006)
 Women in Uniform: Medics and Soldiers and Cops, Oh My!, edited by Pat Cronin (2010)
 Lesbians on the Loose: Crime Writers on the Lam, edited by Narrelle M. Harris (2015)
 The Only One in the World: A Sherlock Holmes Anthology, edited by Narrelle M. Harris (2021)

Anthologies edited 

 Women of the Mean Streets, with Greg Herren (2011)
 Men of the Mean Streets: Gay Noir, with Greg Herren (2011)
 Night Shadows: Queer Horror, with Greg Herren (2012)

Micky Knight series 
 Death by the Riverside (1990)
 Deaths of Jocasta (1992)
 The Intersection of Law and Desire (1995) 
 Lost Daughters (1999) 
 Death of a Dying Man (2009) 
 Water Mark (2010)
 Ill Will (2012) 
 The Shoal of Time (2013)
 The Girl on the Edge of Summer (2017)
 Not Dead Enough (2019)

References

External links 
 Jean M. Redmann

1955 births
Living people
20th-century American novelists
American mystery writers
American women novelists
Lambda Literary Award winners
American lesbian writers
American LGBT rights activists
HIV/AIDS activists
Women mystery writers
Novelists from Louisiana
Novelists from Mississippi
American LGBT novelists
LGBT people from Mississippi
20th-century American women writers
21st-century American women writers